Strömsån is a river in Sweden. At the mouth of the river lies the city of Strömstad, Bohuslän.

References

Rivers of Västra Götaland County